Hilde Synnøve Lid (born 18 March 1971) is a Norwegian freestyle skier. Her achievements include winning an Olympic medal in aerials in 1994, a silver medal in aerials at the 1999 world championships, and placing third overall in aerials in the world cup in 2000.

Career
Lid won a bronze medal in women's aerials at the 1994 Winter Olympics in Lillehammer. She finished 6th at the 1998 Winter Olympics in Nagano, and placed 16th at the 2002 Winter Olympics in Salt Lake City.

She won a silver medal in aerials at the FIS Freestyle World Ski Championships 1999.

She placed third overall in aerials in the 1999–2000 FIS Freestyle Skiing World Cup.

Personal life
Lid was born in Voss on 18 March 1971.

References

External links 
 

1971 births
Living people
People from Voss
Norwegian female freestyle skiers
Freestyle skiers at the 1994 Winter Olympics
Freestyle skiers at the 1998 Winter Olympics
Freestyle skiers at the 2002 Winter Olympics
Olympic bronze medalists for Norway
Olympic medalists in freestyle skiing
Medalists at the 1994 Winter Olympics
Sportspeople from Vestland
20th-century Norwegian women
21st-century Norwegian women